Tarlac City held its local elections on May 9, 2016 within the Philippine general election. The voters elected candidates for mayor, vice mayor, and ten councilors. Incumbent 2nd district board member Cristy Angeles became the first female mayor of Tarlac City after defeating Allan Manalang, son of incumbent Mayor Gelacio Manalang, who unsuccessfully ran for the governorship post.

In the vice mayoral race, incumbent Vice Mayor Anne Belmonte was defeated by former Mayor Aro Mendoza, who also endorsed Cristy Angeles for Mayor. Belmonte, as the highest-placing Councilor during the last elections, replaced then-Vice Mayor Mike Tañedo when the latter died in office last October 5, 2014.

Candidates
Parties are as stated in their certificate of candidacies.

Team Angeles

Team Manalang

Others

Mayoralty and vice mayoral elections
The candidates for mayor and vice mayor with the highest number of votes wins the seat; they are voted separately, therefore, they may be of different parties when elected.

Mayor

Vice Mayor

City Council
Tarlac City, elected Sangguniang Panlungsod or city council members. A voter votes for up to ten candidates, then the ten candidates with the highest number of votes are elected.  Election is via plurality-at-large voting. The total votes are the actual number of voters who voted, not the total votes of all candidates.

Results per candidate

|-background-color:#efefef"
!width=30|Rank
!style="text-align:left;" width=170|Candidate
!style="text-align:left;" width=160|Coalition
!colspan=2 style="text-align:left;"|Party
!width=30|Votes
!width=30|%
|-style="background: #FFFFCC; font-weight:bold"
|1.|| style="text-align:left;" |Jojo Briones || style="text-align:left;" |Team Manalang
|  ||  81,164 || 51.98%
|-style="background: #FFFFCC; font-weight:bold"
|2.|| style="text-align:left;" |Topey delos Reyes || style="text-align:left;" |Team Angeles/NPC-LP
|  || 76,184 || 48.79%
|-style="background: #FFFFCC; font-weight:bold"
|3.|| style="text-align:left;" |Ana Aguas || style="text-align:left;" |Team Angeles/NPC-LP
|    ||68,395 || 43.80%
|-style="background: #FFFFCC; font-weight:bold"
|4.|| style="text-align:left;" |Glenn Troy Caritativo || style="text-align:left;" |Team Manalang
|  ||66,672 || 42.70%
|-style="background: #FFFFCC; font-weight:bold"
|5.|| style="text-align:left;" |Ricky Diolazo || style="text-align:left;" |Team Angeles/NPC-LP
|    || 65,811 || 42.14%
|-style="background: #FFFFCC; font-weight:bold"
|6.|| style="text-align:left;" |Abel Basangan || style="text-align:left;" |Team Angeles/NPC-LP
|      || 65,452 || 41.92%
|-style="background: #FFFFCC; font-weight:bold"
|7.|| style="text-align:left;" |Jerome Lapeña || style="text-align:left;" |Team Angeles/NPC-LP
|    ||  63,384 || 40.59%
|-style="background: #FFFFCC; font-weight:bold"
|8.|| style="text-align:left;" | Weng Quiroz || style="text-align:left;" |Team Angeles/NPC-LP
|    || 56,498 || 36.18%
|-style="background: #FFFFCC; font-weight:bold"
|9.|| style="text-align:left;" | Cesar Go || style="text-align:left;" |Not affiliated
|        ||  51,430 || 32.94%
|-style="background: #FFFFCC; font-weight:bold"
|10.|| style="text-align:left;" | Vlad Rodriguez || style="text-align:left;" |Team Angeles/NPC-LP
|       ||  50,436 || 32.30%
|-
|11.|| style="text-align:left;" | Franklin Dayao || style="text-align:left;" |Team Manalang
|      ||  49,376 || 31.62%
|-
|12.|| style="text-align:left;" | Emy Cortez || style="text-align:left;" |Team Manalang
|    ||  48,526 || 31.08%
|-
|13.|| style="text-align:left;" | Jelo Honrado || style="text-align:left;" |Team Angeles/NPC-LP
|  ||  42,994 || 27.53%
|-
|14.|| style="text-align:left;" |Arsenio Lugay II           || style="text-align:left;" |Team Angeles/NPC-LP
|    ||  35,996 || 23.05%
|-
|15.|| style="text-align:left;" |Eddie Tañedo           || style="text-align:left;" |Team Angeles/NPC-LP
|             ||  34,393 || 22.03%
|-
|16.|| style="text-align:left;" |Benjie Dayan         || style="text-align:left;" |Team Manalang
|    ||  32,911 || 21.08%
|-
|17.|| style="text-align:left;" |Lucia Tanedo           || style="text-align:left;" |Team Manalang
|            ||  29,240 || 18.73%
|-
|18.|| style="text-align:left;" | Tony Nepomuceno        || style="text-align:left;" |Not affiliated
|    ||  23,166 || 14.84%
|-
|19.|| style="text-align:left;" | Edgar Aguas || style="text-align:left;" |Not affiliated
|            ||  22,173 || 14.20%
|-
|20.|| style="text-align:left;" |Richard Espinosa   || style="text-align:left;" |Not affiliated
|            ||  15,231 || 9.75%
|-
|21.|| style="text-align:left;" |Jerry Arceo || style="text-align:left;" | Not affiliated
|            ||  13,313 || 8.53%
|-
|22.|| style="text-align:left;" |Rem Galang || style="text-align:left;" |Not affiliated
|    || 13,084 || 8.38%
|-
|23.|| style="text-align:left;" |Meynard Buena           || style="text-align:left;" |Team Manalang
|    ||  12,999 || 8.32%
|-
|24.|| style="text-align:left;" |Alejandro Bucad|| style="text-align:left;" |Team Manalang
|     ||  10,093 || 6.46%
|-
|25.|| style="text-align:left;" |Babet Bello || style="text-align:left;" | Not affiliated
|   ||  9,226 || 5.91%
|-
|26.|| style="text-align:left;" |Malou Malvar|| style="text-align:left;" | Not affiliated
|    ||  8,434 || 5.40%
|-
|27.|| style="text-align:left;" |Ares Cortez|| style="text-align:left;" | Not affiliated
|    || 7,241 || 4.64%
|-
|28.|| style="text-align:left;" |Nestor Gaerlan|| style="text-align:left;" | Not affiliated
|  ||  4,689 || 3.00%
|-
|29.|| style="text-align:left;" |Ador Vitug|| style="text-align:left;" | Not affiliated
|  ||4,579 || 2.93%
|-
|30.|| style="text-align:left;" |Lesly Tamangan || style="text-align:left;" | Not affiliated
|  ||2,737|| 1.75%
|-
|-style="background-color:#E9E9E9; font-weight:bold"
|colspan=5|Total turnout || 156,154 || 84.71%
|-style="background-color:#E9E9E9; font-weight:bold"
|colspan=5|Registered voters || 184,321 || 100.00%
|-
! style="background-color:#AAAAAA;text-align:left;" colspan=3 | Note: A total of 30 candidates ran for councilor.
!style="background-color:#AAAAAA" colspan=4|Source: GMA-COMELEC transparency server
|}

Results per coalition

Results per party

References

External links
 COMELEC - Official website of the Philippine Commission on Elections (COMELEC)
 NAMFREL - Official website of National Movement for Free Elections (NAMFREL)
 PPCRV - Official website of the Parish Pastoral Council for Responsible Voting (PPCRV)

 
2016 Philippine local elections
Tarlac City